The Hunt-class minesweeper was a class of minesweeping sloop built between 1916 and 1919 for the Royal Navy. They were built in two discrete groups, the earlier Belvoir group designed by the Ailsa Shipbuilding Company and the subsequent (and slightly larger) Aberdare group designed by the Admiralty. They were classed as Fleet Minesweeping Sloops, that is ships intended to clear open water. The Belvoir group were named after British fox hunts. Those of the Aberdare group were originally named after coastal towns, watering places and fishing ports, some of which happened to be hunts by coincidence. However, all were soon renamed after inland locations to prevent confusion caused by the misunderstanding of signals and orders.

Design
These ships had twin screws and had forced-draught coal burning boilers; that is they burned pulverised coal in an artificially augmented airstream. One consequence of this was that they produced a lot of smoke, so much so that they were more usually referred to as Smokey Joes. Another was that if they were fed anything other than the Welsh Steam Coal they were designed for then the fuel consumption was enormous—one ship was bunkered with soft brown Natal coal and burnt 20 tons in a single day.

They had a shallow draught. Armament was one QF  gun forward and a QF 12 pounder aft, plus two twin 0.303 inch machine guns. Their counter-mine equipment consisted of Oropesa floats to cut the cables of moored mines.

Service
Six ships were completed as survey vessels, and the majority of the Aberdare group arrived too late to see service during the First World War. Thirty-five were cancelled after the armistice. Interwar, eight were sold out of service, one was sold to Siam, one was converted to an RNVR drillship and 52 were scrapped. The majority of the remainder spent the period from 1919 to 1939 in reserve around the world, with Malta and Singapore having most of them, so that on the outbreak of World War II there were still 27 available for service, to which a further two were added by requisition from mercantile service.

The 5th Minesweeping Flotilla, comprising Pangourne, Ross, Lydd, Kellet and Albury as well as the newer Halcyon-class Gossamer and Leda sailed from North Shields for Harwich late on 26 May 1940, reaching Harwich nearly 24 hours later.  After coaling, the flotilla sailed for Dunkirk in the afternoon of 28 May, and was off the beach by about 21:30 hours the same day.  At least two ships from the Flotilla (Ross and Lydd) were detailed to collect troops from the harbour mole.  Ross alone took on board 353 men and one dog on this first night.  The ships of the flotilla made a further three trips to Dunkirk in the following days, working at battle-stations virtually round the clock and returning to Margate for the last time from Dunkirk on Saturday, 1 June 1940. Sutton was also present at Dunkirk.

Five ships were lost during the war, and a further vessel, Widnes was beached in Suda Bay, Crete in May 1941 after being bombed by German aircraft. The Germans recovered and repaired the hull, pressing her into service as 12.V4.

Ships

Belvoir group
Twenty ships ordered in 1916:
  – built by Ailsa Shipbuilding Company, Troon, launched 8 March 1917. Sold for breaking up in July 1922.
  – built by Ailsa, launched 8 June 1917. Sold for breaking up 8 January 1923.
  – built by Ardrossan Dry Dock Company, Ardrossan, launched 23 March 1917. Sunk by mine off Montrose 1 May 1918.
  – built by Clyde Shipbuilding Company, Port Glasgow, launched 21 February 1917. Sold for breaking up 22 February 1923.
  – built by Bow, McLachlan and Company, Paisley, launched 28 November 1916. Sold for breaking up 18 January 1923.
  – built by Bow, McLachlan, launched 9 February 1917. Sold for breaking up 18 January 1923.
  – built by Clyde Shipbuilding, launched 22 May 1917. Sold for breaking up in July 1922.
  – built by Dunlop Bremner & Company, Port Glasgow, launched 30 March 1917. Sold for breaking up 21 February 1923.
  – built by Dunlop Bremner, launched 9 May 1917. Sold for breaking up 21 February 1923.
  – built by Fleming & Ferguson, Paisley, launched 9 March 1917. Sold for breaking up in July 1922.
  – built by Fleming & Ferguson, launched 4 June 1917. Sold for breaking up in July 1922.
  – built by D. & W. Henderson and Company, Glasgow, launched 9 November 1916. Sold for breaking up in August 1924.
  – built by Henderson, launched 7 February 1917. Sold for breaking up 4 November 1922.
  – built Lobnitz and Company, Renfrew, launched 28 November 1916. Sold for breaking up 22 January 1923.
  – built by Lobnitz, launched 10 January 1917. Sold for breaking up 18 January 1923.
  – built by Napier and Miller, Old Kilpatrick, launched 24 March 1917. Sold for breaking up in July 1922.
  – built by Napier and Miller, launched 4 June 1917. Sold for breaking up 18 September 1922.
  – built by William Simons and Company, Renfrew, launched 7 July 1917. Sold for breaking up 16 December 1926.
  – built by Simons, launched 20 June 1917. Became a diving tender in August 1923. Sold for breaking up November 1946
  – built by Murdoch and Murray, Port Glasgow, launched 1917. Sold for salvage 18 January 1923.

Aberdare group
One hundred and twenty-nine ships were ordered to this Admiralty design between 1916 and November 1918, of which thirty-four were cancelled (among these, two - Battle and Bloxham - had been launched). Two more were projected to be ordered from Fleming & Ferguson, but these two were never actually ordered:

  – built by Ailsa, launched April 1918, sold for scrapping 1946
  – built by Ailsa, launched June 1918, sold for scrapping 1947
  – built by Ailsa, launched November 1918, sold for scrapping 1947
  – built by Ailsa, launched January 1919, sold for scrapping 1947
  – built by Ailsa, launched 1919, disposed of inter-war
  – built by Ardrossan Dry Dock, launched March 1918, disposed of 1928
  – built by Ardrossan Dry Dock, launched May 1918, paid off 1945, mined in tow off Corfu 1951
  – built by Ayrshire Shipbuilding Company, Irvine, launched May 1918, disposed of inter-war
  – built by Ardrossan Dry Dock, launched May 1919, disposed of inter-war
  – built by Dundee Shipbuilding Company, Dundee, launched 1919, but cancelled October 1919 and sold (incomplete) for breaking up in March 1922. 
  (ex-Burnham) – built by Bow, McLachlan, launched August 1918, disposed of inter-war 
  (ex-Brixham) – built by Ayrshire Shipbuilding, launched 1919, but cancelled October 1919 and sold (incomplete) for breaking up 23 October 1923.
  (ex-Buckie) – built by Bow, McLachlan, launched June 1919, disposed of inter-war
  – built by Ayrshire Shipbuilding, launched May 1919, disposed of inter-war
  (ex-Blakeney) – built by Ayrshire Shipbuilding, launched March 1918,disposed of inter-war
  – built by Joseph R. Eltringham, South Shields, launched May 1919, disposed of inter-war
  – built by Bow, McLachlan, launched December 1918, disposed of inter-war
  – built by Bow, McLachlan, launched December 1918, completed as tender to navigation school, 
  (ex-Cawsand) – built by Bow, McLachlan, launched 1919, disposed of inter-war
  – built by Bow, McLachlan, launched March 1919, completed as tender to navigation school
  – built by Eltringham, launched July 1919, disposed of inter-war
  (ex-Stranraer) – built by Simons, launched May 1918, disposed of inter-war
  – built by Clyde Shipbuilding, launched May 1918, disposed of inter-war
  (ex-Rosslare) – built by McMillan, lost 1919
  (ex-Dawlish) – built by Clyde Shipbuilding, launched August 1918, sold for scrapping 1946
  – built by Clyde Shipbuilding, launched September 1918, disposed of inter-war
  – built by Clyde Shipbuilding, launched January 1919, mined off Harwich 16 October 1940, foundered under tow following day
  – built by Clyde Shipbuilding, launched March 1919, mined and sunk off Great Yarmouth 30 April 1940
  (ex-Troon) – built by Simons, launched March 1919, mined and scrapped in 1945
  – built by Clyde Shipbuilding, launched 1919, disposed of inter-war
  – built by Dunlop Bremner, launched June 1918, sold for scrapping 1948, disposed of inter-war
  – built by Dundee Shipbuilding, launched 1919, bombed by Italian aircraft off Valletta 30 April 1941, then 4 May 1941, written off as constructive total loss
  – built by Dunlop Bremner, launched July 1918, disposed of inter-war
  (ex-Fleetwood) – built by Dunlop Bremner, launched October 1918, to mercantile service interwar, requisitioned September 1939 as salvage vessel HMS Forde, returned 1947
  – built by Dundee Shipbuilding, launched November 1918, disposed of inter-war
  (ex-Fowey) – built by Clyde Shipbuilding, launched November 1918, disposed of inter-war
  – built by Eltringham, launched November 1917, sold 4 November 1922.
  (ex-Gorleston) – built by Eltringham, launched February 1918, sold in June 1928 to Alloa Ship Breaking Company. 
  (ex-Bridlington) – built by Ayrshire Shipbuilding, launched 1919, later hulked as RNVR drillship Irwell, scrapped 1962 
  – built by Eltringham, launched April 1919, disposed of inter-war
  – built by Eltringham, launched July 1918, sold for scrapping 1947, disposed of inter-war
  – built by Eltringham, launched 24 March 1919, sold to Royal Thai Navy in 1922.
  (ex-Helmsdale) – built by Eltringham, launched January 1919, bombed and sunk by German aircraft off Mersa Matruh 31 January 1941 
  (ex-Ilfracombe) – built by Eltringham, launched April 1919, disposed of inter-war
  – built by Fairfield Shipbuilding and Engineering Company, Govan, launched December 1917, disposed of inter-war
  – built by Fairfield, launched February 1918, disposed of inter-war
  – built by Fairfield, launched June 1918, mined in the Aegean Sea on 16 June 1919 with the loss of 12 members of the crew
  (ex-Aldborough) – built by Ardrossan Dry Dock, launched March 1918, disposed of inter-war
  (ex-Minehead) – built by John Harkness and Sons, Middlesbrough, launched March 1919, disposed of inter-war
  (ex-Lydney) built by Fairfield, launched December 1918, sold for scrapping 1947. 
  – built by Fleming & Ferguson, launched October 1918, disposed of inter-war
  – built by Fleming & Ferguson, launched February 1919, disposed of inter-war
  – built by Fleming & Ferguson, launched 1919, completed as submarine depot ship, disposed of inter-war
  – built by Harkness, launched August 1918, disposed of inter-war
  (ex-Maryport) – built by Harkness, launched October 1918, disposed of inter-war
  (ex-Mullion) – built by Harkness, launched May 1919, disposed of inter-war
  (ex-Macduff) – built by Fleming & Ferguson, launched June 1918, disposed of inter-war
  – built by A and J Inglis, Pointhouse, launched August 1918, disposed of inter-war
  (ex-Newlyn) – built by Inglis, launched June 1919, disposed of inter-war
  – built by Eltringham, launched June 1918, disposed of inter-war
  (ex-Padstow) – built by Lobnitz, launched March 1918, sold for scrapping 1947
  – built by Lobnitz, lost 1919 
  (ex-Portmadoc) – built by Lobnitz, launched March 1919, completed as Admiral's yacht; wrecked 11 November 1931 off Tung Yung Island, with C-in-C China Station (Admiral Sir Howard Kelly) embarked
  (ex-Polperro) – built by Lobnitz, launched June 1918, disposed of inter-war
  (ex-Porlock) – built by Lobnitz, launched November 1918, disposed of inter-war
  (ex-Wicklow) – built by Inglis, launched 1919, disposed of inter-war
  (ex-Ramsey) – built by Lobnitz, launched 1919, sold for scrapping 1947
  (ex-Filey) – built by Dunlop Bremner, launched September 1919, disposed of inter-war
  (ex-Shoreham) – built by Murdoch and Murray, launched April 1919, completed as tender to navigation school, 
  – built by Murdoch and Murray, launched July 1918, sold for scrapping 1947
  – built by Murdoch and Murray, launched October 1918, wrecked off Horse Sand Fort 26 October 1945 and written off as constructive total loss, sold for salvage and wrecked under tow 1946
  – built by Murdoch and Murray, launched December 1918, sold for scrapping 1947
  (ex-Tarbert) – built by Simons, launched June 1918, disposed of inter-war
  – built by Napier and Miller, launched February 1918, disposed of inter-war 
  – built by Napier and Miller, launched March 1918, disposed of inter-war
  (ex-Staithes) – built by Charles Rennoldson, South Shields, launched February 1918, disposed of inter-war
  (ex-Southwold) – built by Charles Rennoldson, launched June 1918, bombed and sunk by German aircraft off Tobruk 7 May 1941
  (ex-Salcombe) – built by Archibald McMillan and Son, Dumbarton, launched March 1918, sold for scrapping 1947
  – built by Ardrossan Dry Dock, launched 1919, disposed of inter-war
  – built by Simons, launched September 1918, disposed of inter-war
  – built by Simons, launched November 1918, disposed of inter-war
  – built by Simons, launched December 1918, disposed of inter-war
  (ex-Teignmouth) – built by Simons, launched August 1919, disposed of inter-war
  – built by Simons, launched April 1919, disposed of inter-war
  (ex-Walmer) – built by Simons, launched 1919, disposed of inter-war
  – built by Inglis, launched February 1919, disposed of inter-war
  – (ex-Withernsea) built by Napier and Miller, launched June 1918, bombed by German aircraft in Suda Bay May 1941, beached and abandoned, salvaged as German escort Uj.2109 and sunk by destroyers 17 October 1943
  – built by Napier and Miller, launched August 1918, disposed of inter-war

Survey ships
  (ex-Ambleside) – launched 1919, disposed of inter-war
  (ex-Amersham) – built by Ailsa, launched 1919, disposed of inter-war
 HMS Crozier (ex-Verwood, ex-Ventnor) – built by Simons, launched 1919, Transferred to South African Naval Services, returned to Royal Navy 1933. Used as a blockade runner during Spanish Civil War. In service as fast transport ship Capitán de corbeta Verdía in the Spanish Republican Navy. Rebuilt after the war as Spanish Navy gunnery training ship Virgen de la Caridad. Sold for scrapping in 1960.
  (ex-Pinner, ex-Portreath) – built by Lobnitz, launched 1919, converted to training ship 1939, minesweeper 1940, mined off Great Yarmouth 27 May 1942
  (ex-Radley) – built by Lobnitz, launched 1919, converted to accommodation ship 1940, sold for scrapping 1945
  (ex-Uppingham) – launched 1919, sold for scrapping 1945

References

 British and Empire Warships of the Second World War, H T Lenton, 1998, Greenhill Books,  
 Jane's Fighting Ships of World War I, Janes Publishing, 1919
 The Grand Fleet, Warship Design and Development 1906-1922, D. K. Brown, Chatham Publishing, 1999, 
 Out Sweeps! The Story of the Minesweepers in World War II Paul Lund & Harry Ludlam, W Foulsham & Co, 1978,

External links

 
Mine warfare vessel classes
Ship classes of the Royal Navy